George Cartwright may refer to:

George Cartwright (trader) (1740–1819), British trader and explorer of Labrador
George Cartwright (soldier) (1894–1978), Australian recipient of the Victoria Cross
George Cartwright (soccer), former Australian international soccer player and goalkeeper
George Cartwright (musician) (born 1950), American musician, band-leader, founder of jazz-rock band Curlew
Buns Cartwright (George Hamilton Grahame Montagu Cartwright, 1889–1976), English cricketer and soldier